Pandalam Bypass is a proposed road project by Kerala Infrastructure Investment Fund Board undertaking by Government of Kerala. The project set to be in Pandalam, Pathanamthitta, Kerala.

References

Roads in Pathanamthitta district
Proposed road infrastructure in India
Road interchanges in India